Andrea Mazzuoli ( born February 15, 1992) is an Italian football defender who currently plays for Alessandria, on loan from Siena.

Biography

Youth career
He played 30 matches with Siena youth team in Campionato Nazionale Primavera.

Senior career
He had his first senior experiences with Sambenedettese (Serie D) and Alessandria (Lega Pro Seconda Divisione).

References

External links
http://www.alessandriacalcio.it/giocatori/mazzuoli.asp

Living people
Association football defenders
1992 births
Italian footballers
Sportspeople from Siena
A.C.N. Siena 1904 players
U.S. Alessandria Calcio 1912 players
Footballers from Tuscany